This article lists all power stations in South Sudan. South Sudan Electricity Corporation (SSEC)

Hydroelectric power stations

Proposed hydroelectric power stations

Thermal power stations==

Solar

External links
 The Potential For Hydropower Generation In South Sudan
 Yei Power Station Operated By Yei Electricity Cooperative (YECO)

See also
 List of largest power stations in the world
 List of power stations in Africa

References

South Sudan
Power stations